Schalkwijk may refer to:

 Schalkwijk, Haarlem, a neighbourhood in the city of Haarlem, the Netherlands
 Schalkwijk, Utrecht, a village in the Netherlands

People with the surname 

 Bob Schalkwijk, photographer